is a Quasi-National Park that extends between Akita, Iwate, Miyagi, and Yamagata Prefectures, Japan. 
It is rated a protected landscape (category II) according to the IUCN.

Like all Quasi-National Parks in Japan, the park is managed by the local prefectural governments.

Related municipalities
 Akita: Higashinaruse, Yuzawa
 Iwate: Ichinoseki, Kanegasaki, Kitakami, Nishiwaga, Ōshū
 Miyagi: Kurihara, Ōsaki
 Yamagata: Kaneyama, Mogami, Shinjō

See also
 National Parks of Japan

References
Southerland, Mary and Britton, Dorothy. The National Parks of Japan. Kodansha International (1995).

External links

National parks of Japan
Parks and gardens in Akita Prefecture
Parks and gardens in Iwate Prefecture
Parks and gardens in Miyagi Prefecture
Parks and gardens in Yamagata Prefecture
Protected areas established in 1968
1968 establishments in Japan